Rissoina fenestrata is a species of minute sea snail, a marine gastropod mollusk or micromollusk in the family Rissoinidae.

Distribution
This species occurs in the Caribbean Sea and the Gulf of Mexico; in the Indian Ocean off the Aldabra Atoll.

Description 
The maximum recorded shell length is 4.5 mm.

Habitat 
Minimum recorded depth is 52 m. Maximum recorded depth is 52 m.

References

 Schwartz von Mohrenstern G. (1860-1864). über die familie der Rissoiden und insbesondere die gattung Rissoina. Denkschriften der Mathematisch-Naturwissenschaftlichen Classe der Kaiserlichen Akademie der Wissenschaften, Wien 19 [1860], pp. 71–188 + 11 pl.; [1864], pp. 56 + 4 pl.
 Taylor, J.D. (1973). Provisional list of the mollusca of Aldabra Atoll.
 Rosenberg, G., F. Moretzsohn, and E. F. García. 2009. Gastropoda (Mollusca) of the Gulf of Mexico, Pp. 579–699 in Felder, D.L. and D.K. Camp (eds.), Gulf of Mexico–Origins, Waters, and Biota. Biodiversity. Texas A&M Press, College Station, Texas.

Rissoinidae